Satnarine Sharma (1942/1943 – October 9, 2019) was the Chief Justice of Trinidad and Tobago from 2002 until 2008. He was succeeded by Ivor Archie.

Controversy 
In July 2006, Sharma was arrested and accused of trying to help Basdeo Panday, a former prime minister who was sentenced in April to two years in prison for corruption, an action which some perceived as racist. An international tribunal ruled that there was insufficient evidence to remove him from office in December 2007. He however resigned as scheduled in January 2008.

References 

1940s births
Year of birth missing
2019 deaths
20th-century Trinidad and Tobago lawyers
Chief justices of Trinidad and Tobago
Trinidad and Tobago people of Indian descent
21st-century Trinidad and Tobago judges